Matti Antero Hautamäki (born 14 July 1981) is a Finnish former ski jumper who competed from 1997 to 2012. He is one of Finland's most successful ski jumpers, having won sixteen individual World Cup competitions; multiple medals at the Winter Olympics, Ski Jumping World Championships and Ski Flying World Championships; the Nordic Tournament twice; and four ski flying world records.

Career

Ski jumping
Hautamäki started ski jumping at the age of seven near his hometown of Oulu. When his older brother Jussi and friend Lauri Hakola moved to Kuopio, Matti joined them. At first he found it difficult to be independent at the age of sixteen, but he received much help and support from his brother, with whom he was living at the time. The help of his new coach Pekka Niemelä, whom he met at the sports school in Kuopio, also helped him advance quickly. In the same year Matti had his first real successes and won medals at the 1997 and 1999 FIS Junior World Ski Jumping Championships.

At the Four Hills Tournament in 2001/02, Hautamäki finished second, his highest ever place in that tournament. In 2002 and 2005 he won the Nordic Tournament, with a clean sweep of all four events in the latter. It was during the 2004–05 season that he won six individual events in a row, including the pre-Winter Olympics rehearsal in Pragelato, and the first ski flying event in Planica; this matched the record for the most consecutive victories set by countryman Janne Ahonen in the same season. Hautamäki also won the ski jumping event at the 2005 Holmenkollen Ski Festival in Oslo.

Ski flying
Hautamäki was regarded as a specialist at ski flying, with the majority of his personal best distances being achieved in Planica. An early sign of things to come was showcased on 23 March 2002 when he jumped 224.5 metres, nearly equalling the then-world record of 225 m set two years prior by Andreas Goldberger. This was then shattered again by Romøren only minutes later, who jumped . Some minutes after that, Janne Ahonen jumped , but this was rendered invalid due to him falling hard upon landing.

World Cup

Standings

Wins

Ski jumping world records

References

External links

1981 births
Living people
Sportspeople from Oulu
Finnish male ski jumpers
Holmenkollen Ski Festival winners
Olympic ski jumpers of Finland
Olympic silver medalists for Finland
Olympic bronze medalists for Finland
Ski jumpers at the 2002 Winter Olympics
Ski jumpers at the 2006 Winter Olympics
Ski jumpers at the 2010 Winter Olympics
Olympic medalists in ski jumping
FIS Nordic World Ski Championships medalists in ski jumping
Medalists at the 2006 Winter Olympics
Medalists at the 2002 Winter Olympics
World record setters in ski flying